is a railway station in the town of Kiso, Nagano Prefecture, Japan, operated by Central Japan Railway Company (JR Tōkai).

Lines

Layout
The station has one island platform connected to the station building by an underground passage. The station is staffed. An old JNR Class D51 locomotive is preserved at the station as a local attraction.

Platforms

Adjacent stations

|-
!colspan=5|

History
Kiso-Fukushima Station was opened on 25 November 1910. On 1 April 1987, it became part of JR Tōkai.

Passenger statistics
In fiscal 2015, the station was used by an average of 774 passengers daily (boarding passengers only).

Surrounding area
Kiso Town Hall
Kiso Fukushima Post Office
Nagano Prefectural Kiso Seiho High School

See also

 List of Railway Stations in Japan

References

Railway stations in Japan opened in 1910
Railway stations in Nagano Prefecture
Stations of Central Japan Railway Company
Chūō Main Line
Kiso, Nagano (town)